Caird Hall is a concert auditorium located in Dundee, Scotland. It is a Category A listed building.

History
The site currently occupied by the building was occupied by a series of closes and tenements. The foundation stone for the building was laid by King George V and Queen Mary on 10 July 1914. It was designed by the town architect James Thomson, assisted by Vernon Constable, while the decorative plaster work was produced by H. H. Martyn & Company of Cheltenham, Gloucestershire, holders of the Royal Warrant. The building, which was named after its benefactor, the jute baron, Sir James Caird, was officially opened by the Prince of Wales on 23 October 1923. The hall's pipe organ was built in 1923 by Harrison & Harrison, who also completed a restoration in 1992.

During the COVID-19 pandemic, the Caird Hall was used as mass vaccination centre operated by NHS Tayside. It opened on 2 February 2021 and closed on 20 September 2021, completing 135,000 vaccinations.

Events
The venue has a capacity of 2,300 fully seated, but can be subdivided or converted to standing where required. The hall is used for graduation ceremonies from the University of Dundee, the University of Abertay Dundee and Dundee and Angus College, as well as other significant university events. The Royal Scottish National Orchestra opened its 2019/20 season at the Caird Hall in October 2019.

In popular culture 
The exterior of Caird Hall was used as a location during the filming of the Alan Bennett scripted An Englishman Abroad in 1983. It was decorated with placards of communist leaders, to take the part of a theatre in Moscow.

References

External links 
 

Buildings and structures in Dundee
Category A listed buildings in Dundee
Listed theatres in Scotland
Buildings and structures completed in 1923